Marie Karlsson  (born 4 December 1963) is a Swedish footballer who played as a midfielder for the Sweden women's national football team. She was part of the team at the 1987 European Competition for Women's Football, 1989 European Competition for Women's Football, and inaugural 1991 FIFA Women's World Cup. At the club level she played for Öxabäck/Marks IF in Sweden.

References

External links
 

1963 births
Living people
Swedish women's footballers
Sweden women's international footballers
Place of birth missing (living people)
1991 FIFA Women's World Cup players
Women's association football midfielders
Öxabäcks IF players
Damallsvenskan players